Publications named Pacific Review include:
The Pacific Review published by Taylor & Francis
pacific REVIEW published by the San Diego State University College of Arts & Letters